The Queens Museum, formerly the Queens Museum of Art, is an art museum and educational center located in Flushing Meadows–Corona Park in the borough of Queens in New York City, United States. The museum was founded in 1972, and has among its permanent exhibitions, the Panorama of the City of New York, a room-sized scale model of the five boroughs originally built for the 1964 New York World's Fair, and repeatedly updated since then. It also has a large archive of artifacts from both the 1939 and 1964 World's Fairs, a selection of which is on display.

Building history

The Queens Museum is located in the New York City Building, the historic pavilion designed by architect Aymar Embury II for the 1939 World's Fair.  From 1946 to 1950, the pavilion was the temporary home of the United Nations General Assembly, and was the site of numerous defining moments in the UN's early years, including the creation of UNICEF,  the partition of  Korea and the authorization by the UN of the creation of Israel.

In 1964, the building was renovated by architect Daniel Chait and was once again used as the New York City Pavilion for the 1964 World's Fair, where it displayed the Panorama of the City of New York, which is still on display.  The pavilion had originally infront of it the Trylon and Perisphere, the central monument of the 1939 fair, which was dismantled after the fair, but after a circular arrangement of flags at the site, for the United Nations Assembly, the site was used for the still standing Unisphere of the 1964 fair.

In 1972, with minor alterations, the north side of the New York City building was converted into the Queens Center for Art and Culture, later renamed the Queens Museum of Art. In 1994, the building underwent a further renovation, with architect Rafael Viñoly reconfiguring the structure into galleries, classrooms, and offices. For many years, half of the building was an ice skating rink.

The museum embarked on a $69 million expansion project in 2009, which was originally slated to be completed in October 2013. The ice skating rink, which had occupied the southern half of the building for six decades, was relocated to a new facility in the northeastern section of Flushing Meadows–Corona Park. The expanded museum reopened in November 2013  with a new entrance at Grand Central Parkway.

In 2016, the Queens Museum was unexpectedly closed from September 3–13 due to security restrictions for events at the nearby Grandstand Stadium for the US Open tennis competition. , it is not clear whether or not heavy security for future sports events will affect the museum's accessibility to the public.

Collections and exhibits

Permanent collection
The museum's permanent collection consists of around 10,000 items, over 6,000 of which are documents and objects related to the 1939 and 1964 World's Fairs, some of which are on long-term display. Recent acquisitions, either through purchase or donation, include works by Salvador Dalí, Mark Dion, Andrew Moore's photographs from Robert Moses and the Modern City (a collection of 20th century photographs from the 1964 World's Fair Kodak Pavilion), crime scene photographs from the Daily News Archive (1920s–1960s), and nearly 1,000 drawings by the court reporter and political cartoonist William Sharp.

Neustadt Collection of Tiffany Glass
Since 1995, the museum has maintained a partnership with the Neustadt Collection of Tiffany glass. Selections from the collection are on long-term display, drawn from a large private Tiffany collection assembled by Dr. Egon Neustadt and his wife Hildegard starting in the mid-1930s. The collection consists of windows, lamps, and related objects, and also boasts an archive of nearly 300,000 pieces of flat and sheet glass formerly stocked by the Tiffany Studios. A selected subset of the collection, containing representative samples of each type, color, texture, and pattern of this material is being established for exhibition and study.

The history of the creation of Tiffany's artworks is featured in the Queens Museum exhibitions, as Tiffany Studios and Furnaces was once located within studios in Corona, which were closed in the 1930s.

Panorama of the City of New York

The best-known permanent exhibition at the Queens Museum is the Panorama of the City of New York, which was commissioned by Robert Moses for the 1964 World's Fair.  A celebration of the city's municipal infrastructure, this  architectural model includes every single building constructed before 1992 in all five boroughs, at a scale of 1 inch = 100 feet (1:1200). The Panorama was built by a team of 100 people working for the architectural model makers Raymond Lester Associates in the three years before the opening of the 1964 World's Fair. The model was constructed in 273 sections, depicting a total of 895,000 individual structures; the section showing the Far Rockaway neighborhood was never installed, due to space limitations.

The Panorama was one of the most successful attractions at the 1964 Fair, with "millions" of people paying 10 cents each for a 9-minute simulated helicopter ride around the city.

After the Fair closed, the Panorama remained open to the public, and Lester's team updated the map in 1967, 1968, and 1969. After 1970, very few changes were made until 1992, when again Lester Associates was hired to update the model to coincide with the re-opening of the museum, after a two-year total renovation  of the building by Rafael Viñoly.  The model makers changed over 60,000 structures to bring it up-to-date at that time.

In March 2009, the museum announced the intention to update the Panorama on an ongoing basis.  To raise funds and draw public attention, the museum will allow individuals and developers to have accurate scale models made of buildings newer than the 1992 update created and added, in exchange for a donation of at least $50. More-detailed models of smaller apartment buildings and private homes, now represented by generic models, can also be added.

, the original twin towers of the World Trade Center are still on the map, even though some new buildings have been built on the actual site; the museum has chosen to allow the destroyed structures to remain until construction is complete, rather than representing the ongoing construction. The first new building to be added under the new program was the new Citi Field stadium of the New York Mets; the model of the old Shea Stadium was to be displayed elsewhere in the museum.

The mechanical "helicopter" vehicles for conveying exhibition visitors were showing signs of wear, and were removed before the 1994 reopening. The current installation by Viñoly features accessible ramps and an elevated walkway which surround the Panorama, allowing viewers to proceed at their own pace, or to linger for as long a look as they desire. Because of space constraints, portions of the walkway are cantilevered over the outer edges of the map, but a glass floor still allows views of the model below. As in the original installation, tiny scale model airplanes take off and land at LaGuardia Airport, mechanically guided by long wires.

The New York City Panorama was featured in two 2011 fictional works: the movie New Year's Eve directed by Garry Marshall, and the book Wonderstruck by Brian Selznick. Each year, the Queens Museum hosts the "Panorama Challenge", a trivia contest run by The City Reliquary. Contestants use the Panorama to identify various New York City landmarks.

A scale model of the 1964 New York World's Fair site, showing all the buildings and pavilions of the time, is located in a separate area devoted to World's Fair exhibits.

Relief Map of the New York City Water Supply System
For the 1939 World's Fair, city agencies were invited to produce exhibits for the New York City Pavilion. The Department of Water Supply, Gas and Electricity (a New York City Department of Environmental Protection predecessor agency) commissioned the Cartographic Survey Force of the Works Progress Administration to create the large Relief Map of the New York City Water Supply System and watershed. Work began in 1938, and a team of map builders toiled over the map with an immense depression-era budget of $100,000.  At , the map was too big for the allocated space in the New York City pavilion, resulting in its elimination from the World's Fair. Ten years later, the map made its first and only public debut at the city's Golden Anniversary Exposition in Manhattan's Grand Central Palace.

By the start of the 21st century, the 27-piece map in storage was in desperate need of conservation. In October 2006, the New York City Department of Environmental Protection and the Queens Museum sent the historic display to McKay Lodge Fine Arts Conservation Lab in Oberlin, Ohio, for restoration. Over the next 18 months, conservators and technicians worked on the model full-time, removing over 70 years of accumulated dirt and re-paintings. Clearing away the dirt and debris, they found much of the original geography and painted details to be intact or recoverable. Road maps and satellite images were used to restore lost portions of the model.

Near the 70th anniversary of the model and the 100th anniversary of the inauguration of the Catskill System's construction, the map was restored to its original form and was installed in the former New York City Building (now the Queens Museum), where it remains on long-term loan.

World's Fair Visual Storage and Gallery 
Located on the second floor of the Queens Museum, this exhibit displays memorabilia from both the 1939 and 1964 World's Fairs. This exhibit has a long term connection with Queens Museum because both events were held at Flushing Meadows–Corona Park, and the museum building is the only remnant structure surviving from both celebrations. The online catalog contains over 10,000 items in total from both fairs.

A scale model of the 1964 New York World's Fair site, including all of its buildings and pavilions, is located in the exhibit gallery.  It is protected under a clear plastic dome, allowing a close examination of the model, in which each significant structure is labeled with a small flag.

Education and outreach

Community relations

Each year, through exhibitions and programs the Queens Museum serves about 200,000 visitors. Attendance is drawn from Queens, the other NYC boroughs and Nassau County as well as international visitors. Museum audiences are distinguished by the diversity of visitors, reflecting the variety of ethnicities living in the borough. Over the last 20 years, a demographic shift has transformed Queens into the most culturally diverse county in the nation, according to the 2000 census: 37% of the population is White, 25% Latino, 20% African-American, and 18% Asian.  There are roughly 138 languages spoken in Queens, and more than half of the households are run by people born outside of the United States.

Programs

The Queens Museum's learning programs annually engages over adults and children.

The museum offers visitors a range of film screenings, dance performances, musical experiences, and public dialogues to provide a point of entry for understanding exhibitions, in addition to making some spaces in the museum available for rental by outside groups.

Public events

The Public Events Department at the Queens Museum was founded in 2002, and is said to have resulted in increased attendance at the museum.

Controversy

The museum was widely criticized in 2017 for cancelling its agreement to rent space for a party celebrating the 70th anniversary of the Independence of the State of Israel citing objections raised by “Palestinian friends of the museum”.  The museum director at the time, Laura Raicovich, who had called the party a “political event”, is the co-editor of Assuming Boycott: Resistance, Agency and Cultural Production. (OR Books, 2017 ), a book  advocating the boycott of Israel. The cancellation of the event was condemned by many politicians including Grace Meng, Dov Hikind, Michael Simanowitz, and Rory Lancman, who worked to restore the museum's commitment to host the event.  The planned event was to include a staged reenactment of the November 29, 1947, United Nations vote to partition the British Mandate for Palestine, an event that took place in the building in space that is now the museum's main gallery. Following the controversy, the event was held and Ms. Raiocovich resigned.

References

External links

  (Queens Museum)

1939 New York World's Fair
1964 New York World's Fair
Art museums established in 1939
Art museums and galleries in New York City
Museums in Queens, New York
Art museums established in 1972
World's fair architecture in New York City
1972 establishments in New York City
Flushing, Queens
Flushing Meadows–Corona Park
Maps of New York City